Dois may refer to:
RTP2, a Portuguese television channel
Dois (album), by Legião Urbana
DOIs, plural of digital object identifier